Larry Adams is a former member of the Ohio House of Representatives.

Larry Adams served two terms as a State Representative, representing the 86th District. Prior, he was a commissioner for Marion County.  Currently, he is a representative for the USDA.

References

Republican Party members of the Ohio House of Representatives
Living people
Year of birth missing (living people)